Brightest Day is a 2010–11 crossover storyline published by DC Comics, consisting of a year-long comic book maxiseries that began in April 2010, and a number of tie-in books. The story is a direct follow-up to the Blackest Night storyline that depicts the aftermath of the events of that storyline on the DC Universe.

Plot

At the end of the 2009–2010 Blackest Night storyline, 12 deceased heroes and villains are resurrected for some unknown purpose. The events of Brightest Day follow the exploits of these characters as they seek to learn the secret behind their return to life.

Assignments
Brightest Day #7 revealed that the 12 resurrected must complete an individual assignment given to them by the White Lantern Entity. If they are successful, their lives will be fully returned.

 Professor Zoom the Reverse-Flash helped release Barry Allen from the Speed Force (mentioned in The Flash: Rebirth #4).
 Jade balanced the darkness (shown in Justice League of America #48).
 Osiris freed Isis, the goddess of nature (shown in Titans #32).
 Maxwell Lord stopped Magog from bringing about the events seen in Kingdom Come (shown in Justice League: Generation Lost #13).
 Hawkgirl prevented Hath-Set from killing Hawkman (shown in Brightest Day #18).
 Hawkman closed the dimensional gateway between Hawkworld and Earth (shown in Brightest Day #18).
 Aquaman already enlisted the new Aqualad to his side before the "others" do (shown in Brightest Day #20).
 The Martian Manhunter burned down the Martian forest, killed D'Kay D'razz and chose to devote himself to the protection of Earth. (shown in Brightest Day #21).
 Jason Rusch and Ronnie Raymond defeated the Black Lantern corruption in their Firestorm Matrix called Deathstorm before it destroyed the universe (shown in Brightest Day #22).
 Captain Boomerang threw a boomerang at Dove (shown in Brightest Day #24).
 Hawk was assigned to catch the boomerang thrown at the Dove by Captain Boomerang, but failed to do so (shown in Brightest Day #24).
 Boston Brand was to find the new champion who will bear the white light of life and take the Entity's place (revealed as Alec Holland, the new Swamp Thing, as of Brightest Day #24).

Publication history
The series, written by Geoff Johns and Peter Tomasi, was published twice a month for 24 issues (25 if including issue #0) alternating with Justice League: Generation Lost written by Keith Giffen and Judd Winick. Johns has discussed the general theme:

Brightest Day also crossed over into the Green Lantern series, the Green Lantern Corps, Justice League of America, The Titans and The Flash. Gail Simone returned to a new volume of the Birds of Prey comic book, which also went under the same banner. Other tie-ins included the first issues of a relaunched Green Arrow and the Justice Society of America. Jeff Lemire wrote the one-shot Brightest Day: The Atom Special with artist Mahmud Asrar, which acted as a springboard for an Atom story to co-feature in Adventure Comics with the same creative team.

The Green Lantern series featured more of the characters Atrocitus, Larfleeze, Saint Walker, and Indigo-1 in a story arc titled "New Guardians". At Emerald City Comic-Con 2010, Johns also stated that Firestorm would be a "main character" in Brightest Day.

The first issue, issue #0, was penciled by Fernando Pasarin. David Finch, a newly DC exclusive artist, illustrated the covers for the entire series.

"Brightest Day" event was also used to introduce Jackson Hyde, the new Aqualad created for the Young Justice animated series, into the DC Universe. Similarly, the final issue of the series reintroduced the Swamp Thing and John Constantine into the mainstream DC Universe after a number of years in DC's mature Vertigo imprint.

Summary

The story begins the day after Blackest Night showing Boston smashing his tombstone. Nearby, a baby bird falls out of its nest and dies, but is resurrected by the white ring that Boston has on. The ring then takes him to everyone that was resurrected and he (while being invisible) sees how they are celebrating their new leases on life. Boston then asks the ring why it is showing him this; its answer was - it needs help. It then takes him to the destroyed Star City and creates a forest.

Titles 
 Brightest Day #0-24 (twice monthly, 25 issues including issue #0) focuses on the resurrected Deadman, Hawkman, Hawkgirl, Martian Manhunter, Aquaman, and Firestorm.
 Green Lantern (vol. 4) #53-62 focuses on Hal Jordan, as well as the other representatives of the other Lantern Corps, as they attempt to prevent the capture of all the emotional entities which eventually leads to the Green Lantern Corps War.
 Green Lantern Corps (vol. 2) #47-57 focuses on Kyle Rayner, John Stewart, and Ganthet as they face the revolt of the Alpha Lanterns and the return of the Weaponers of Qward until the War of the Green Lantern Corps erupts.
 Green Lantern: Emerald Warriors (issues #1-6) focuses on Guy Gardner, Kilowog, Arisia, Sodam Yat and the Red Lantern Bleez as they put in motion a universe-saving plan against a new, hidden foe to prevent the War of the Green Lantern Corps.
 Brightest Day: The Atom Special is a one-shot that was bannered as a Brightest Day tie-in, but is in actuality an introduction to the Atom miniseries contained within Adventure Comics #516-521 and Giant-Size Atom #1.
 Birds of Prey (vol. 2) #1-6 focuses on the resurrected Hawk as well as the Dove's connection to the White Light.
 The Flash (vol. 3) #1-7 features the resurrected Captain Boomerang.
 Green Arrow (vol. 4) #1-12 focuses on the Star City forest that sprouted from the White Lantern ring.
 Justice League of America (vol. 3) #44-48 focuses on the resurrected Jade as she tries to save her brother and father from the control of the Starheart.
 Justice League: Generation Lost #1-24 (twice monthly, 24 issues) focuses on Booster Gold, Captain Atom, Fire, and Ice as they attempt to find the resurrected Maxwell Lord.
 Justice Society of America (vol. 3) #40-43, which is part of the storyline shared with Justice League of America #44-48.
 Titans (vol. 2) #24-30 focuses on the resurrected Osiris as he joins a team of villains led by Deathstroke the Terminator, and composed of the Tattooed Man, Cheshire, and a new character named Cinder. An additional special called Titans: Villains For Hire Special #1 precedes number #24 and deals with the death of Ryan Choi, the fourth Atom, at the hands of the villains. For unknown reasons, issue #28 was the last issue to be labeled as a Brightest Day tie-in.

Involved, but not listed, under the Brightest Day banner
 Action Comics (beginning with issue #890–900) focuses on Lex Luthor and his universal quest to locate the energy of the Black Lantern Corps. Incidentally, issue #890 was labeled as Blackest Night Aftermath.
 Booster Gold (vol. 2) #33–43 picks up on elements of the search for Maxwell Lord in Justice League: Generation Lost.
 Power Girl #13–23 is loosely connected with Justice League: Generation Lost.
 Untold Tales from Blackest Night #1 (October 2010): while it was labeled as "Blackest Night", this one-shot is loosely connected with Brightest Day #11–12, Green Lantern #59, and Green Arrow #5, all of which involve the return of the Black Lantern Corps.
 Green Lantern: Larfleeze Christmas Special: while not bannered as a "Brightest Day" tie-in, this issue is a tongue-in-cheek one-shot issue focusing on Larfleeze's misunderstanding of the meaning of Christmas.
 Shazam! #1: this one-shot is loosely connected with Osiris' mission to rescue his sister Isis.
 Teen Titans (vol. 3) #83 explains why the Blue Beetle would be taking a leave of absence from the Titans, and the events of Generation Lost #2 are indirectly mentioned there as well.
 War of the Green Lanterns is a storyline that crosses over all three Green Lantern titles, and is a direct continuation of the "Brightest Day" story arcs. (Green Lantern  #63-67, Green Lantern Corps #58-60, Green Lantern: Emerald Warriors #7-10 and War of the Green Lanterns: Aftermath #1-2)

Brightest Day Aftermath: The Search for Swamp Thing
In June, a three-issue miniseries involved the return of John Constantine to the DC Universe and his attempt to convince Superman and Batman that the choosing of Alec Holland (the new Swamp Thing) as the Earth's new protector is inevitable and the resurrected Alec Holland will have to die, so that his soul can merge again with the Green.

 Brightest Day Aftermath: The Search for Swamp Thing #1, 32 pages, June 22, 2011
 Brightest Day Aftermath: The Search for Swamp Thing #2, 32 pages, July 27, 2011
 Brightest Day Aftermath: The Search for Swamp Thing #3, 32 pages, August 24, 2011

Collected editions
The series is collected into a number of volumes:

Brightest Day Volume One (collects Brightest Day #0–7, 256 pages, hardcover, December 2010, ; softcover, December 2011)
Brightest Day Volume Two (collects Brightest Day #8–16, 240 pages, hardcover, May 2011, ; softcover, May 2012, ISBN)
Brightest Day Volume Three (collects Brightest Day #17–24, 280 pages, hardcover, September 2011)

Other titles are also being collected:
Birds of Prey Volume One: Endrun (collects Birds of Prey (vol. 2) #1–6, 160 pages, hardcover, May 2011)
The Flash Volume One: The Dastardly Death of the Rogues (collects The Flash (vol. 3) #1–6 and The Flash Secret Files and Origins 2010 #1, 208 pages, hardcover, February 2011, ; paperback, January 2012)
Green Arrow Volume One: Into the Woods (collects Green Arrow (vol. 4) #1–7, 192 pages, hardcover, July 2011)
Green Arrow Volume Two: Salvation (collects Green Arrow (vol. 4) #8–14, 192 pages, paperback, February 2013)
Green Lantern: Brightest Day (collects Green Lantern (vol. 4) #53–62, 256 pages, hardcover, June 2011, paperback, May 2012)
Green Lantern Corps: Revolt of the Alpha Lanterns (collects Green Lantern Corps (vol. 2) #21–22 and 48–52, 176 pages, hardcover, May 2011)
Green Lantern Corps: The Weaponer (collects Green Lantern Corps (vol. 2) #53-57, 128 pages, hardcover, October 2011, , paperback, October 2012, )
Green Lantern: Emerald Warriors Volume One (collects Green Lantern: Emerald Warriors #1–7, 176 pages, hardcover, August 2011)
Justice League: Generation Lost Volume One (collects Justice League: Generation Lost #1–12, 320 pages, hardcover, April 2011, ; paperback, February 2012)
Justice League: Generation Lost Volume Two (collects Justice League: Generation Lost #13–24, 320 pages, hardcover, October 2011 )
Justice League of America: the Dark Things (collects Justice League of America #44-48, Justice Society of America #41-42).

In other media
A Brightest Day skin attributed to Batman is one of the special skins in Batman: Arkham Origins.

References

External links
 
 Brightest Day on The Source, DC Comics blog
 
 

Comics by Peter J. Tomasi
Fiction about resurrection
Comics by Geoff Johns
DC Comics limited series